Resalat is a neighborhood located in eastern part of Tehran, Iran.

Resalat Highway joins this locality to Seyed Khandan in north-central Tehran and further to western parts of Tehran metropolis.

Neighbourhoods in Tehran